Golden Madonna (Italian: La madonnina d'oro) is a 1949 British-Italian drama film directed by Luigi Carpentieri and Ladislao Vajda and starring Phyllis Calvert, Tullio Carminati and Michael Rennie. It was considered a lost film and was on the  BFI 75 Most Wanted list, until a copy was loaned to the British Film Institute by Cohen Media. Filmed on location, a group of original negatives and contact prints taken by Francis Goodman are in the possession of London's National Portrait Gallery.

The film's sets were designed by the art director Guido Fiorini.

Plot
Patricia, a young British woman inherits an estate in rural Italy, and gives up her job as a schoolteacher. Soon after she arrives she  offends the village where she now plans to live by accidentally throwing away a sacred painting of the Madonna which they consider to be lucky and a protector of the community. To redeem herself she goes out in search of the painting with the assistance of a British ex-army Captain, hoping to return in to the village. 

A romance begins between her and the Captain, but a gang of street urchins steal his money. The Captain has painted over the Madonna with his own painting of The Laughing Cavalier before it disappeared.

In Naples she is first cheated by Johnny Lester, a British Spiv, and his tiny Italian gangster sidekick , but later receives his help to steal back the painting from a wealthy collector, Julian Migone, who has taken the Madonna to his cliff-top villa on Capri.

Patricia, pretending to be a rich countess, travels alone to Capri by boat but the moneyless Captain is given a ticket by one of the young Naples street urchins. She plays along with Migone's attempt to seduce her in order to get the painting back.

She and the Captain are stopped by police when trying to return on the boat, and their luggage is searched, but the painting has disappeared. It has been stolen by Johnny who successfully gets it back to the mainland.

Patricia returns the painting to the church where it is received with much ceremony.

Cast
 Phyllis Calvert as Patricia Chandler
 Tullio Carminati as Signor Migone
 Michael Rennie as Mike Christie, the Captain
 David Greene as Johnny Lester
 Aldo Silvani as Don Vincenzo
 Pippo Bonucci as Pippo
 Francesca Biondi as Maria
 Franco Coop as Esposito
 Claudio Ermelli as Antonio

References

External links
BFI 75 Most Wanted entry, with extensive notes

The Golden Madonna at Variety Distribution
Review of film at Variety
Italian version

1949 films
British black-and-white films
1949 drama films
1940s English-language films
English-language Italian films
Films directed by Ladislao Vajda
Films set in Naples
Films shot in Naples
1940s rediscovered films
British drama films
Warner Bros. films
Films set in Capri, Campania
Italian black-and-white films
Italian drama films
Rediscovered British films
Rediscovered Italian films
British multilingual films
Italian multilingual films
1940s multilingual films
1940s British films
1940s Italian films